Roland Teichmann (born April 19, 1970 in Salzburg, Austria) is the director of the Austrian Film Institute.

References

External links
 https://filminstitut.at/en/institute/team

Austrian art directors
1970 births
Living people
20th-century Austrian male artists
21st-century Austrian male artists
Film people from Salzburg